The Shenandoah is a  topsail schooner built in Maine in 1964, and operates as a cruise ship and educational vessel in the waters of Vineyard Haven Harbor, Martha's Vineyard, Massachusetts. She is claimed to be the only schooner of her size and topsail rig without an engine in the world.

History 

The Shenandoah's design is based on an 1850s ship Joe Lane, but Captain Douglas made numerous changes to improve the power of the vessel. Douglas has been the vessel's only skipper since her launch in 1964.

The Shenandoah required extensive hull repairs and was dry docked in 2009.

General characteristics 

Type: Topsail schooner

Designed by: Captain Robert S. Douglas

Built by: Harvey F. Gamage Ship Building Co.

Length (overall): 

Sparred length:  (from jib boom to main boom end)

Sails:  of canvas

Topmast height: 

Displacement: 170 tons (173 t)

Hull: made of Maine oak

Deck: made of pine

Lower masts: 20 inches diameter, 2.5 tons each

Maximum speed: 

Maximum capacity: 30 passengers overnight

A range of one to four berths can be found in the 11 cabins below deck. It houses seven crew members, a first-mate, a cook, and the captain. The ship contains two heads, a main saloon, and a galley.

Shenandoah gallery

See also
 Alabama schooner
 List of schooners

References

External links
 The Black Dog Tall Ships

Schooners of the United States
Tall ships of the United States
Two-masted ships
1964 ships
Individual sailing vessels
Ships built in Maine
Tall ships
Maritime culture